This is a list of hazing deaths in the United States. This is not an exhaustive list. An exact list is not available because there is no central system for tracking hazing deaths, and the role of hazing in some deaths is subject to disagreement. Inclusion in this list requires that the incident was described by the media as a hazing-related death. Incidents involving criminal or civil proceedings that did not find a definite link with hazing may still be included if they meet this criterion.

According to the National Collaborative for Hazing Research and Prevention at the University of Maine, hazing is defined as "any activity expected of someone joining or participating in a group that humiliates, degrades, abuses or endangers them, regardless of a person's willingness to participate". Although hazing is often associated with the activities that take place as a prerequisite for joining a group, it can also include activities that take place as an established member, such as the 2011 death of fraternity brother George Desdunes.

There has been at least one university hazing death each year from 1969 to 2021. According to Franklin College journalism professor Hank Nuwer, over 200 university hazing deaths have occurred since 1838, with 40 deaths between 2007 and 2017 alone. Alcohol poisoning is the biggest cause of death.

18th and 19th century

1900s

1910s

1920s

1930s

1940s

1950s

1960s

1970s

1980s

1990s

2000s

2010s

2020s

See also 
 Death of Tim Piazza
 Death of Logan Melgar
 Hazing
 Hazing in Greek letter organizations
 History of North American college fraternities and sororities
 Matt's Law
 Suicide of Danny Chen
 Suicide of Harry Lew

References

External links 

 Hank Nuwer's List of Deaths by Hazing

Education issues
Rites of passage
Death-related lists
Lists of people by cause of death
Accidental deaths in the United States
Hazing
Death in the United States-related lists
University folklore